Zapotitlán de Vadillo is a town and municipality, in Jalisco in central-western Mexico. The municipality covers an area of 480.74 km².

As of 2005, the municipality had a total population of 6,345.

The indigenous inhabitants of this area spoke the Zapoteco language of the western Otomi languages.  During the colonial era it was part of the province of Amula.

Government
The form of government is democratic. The municipal president and the rest of the councilors with a relative majority, as well as those with proportional representation, are elected every three years by free and universal suffrage of citizens over 18 years of age in full exercise of their political rights.

Municipal presidents

References

Municipalities of Jalisco